Interactive contract manufacturing (ICM) is a neologism to describe the business model of companies that design, build, and deliver interactive assets for their business partners.  In this model, advertising agencies team with an ICM in order to provide their clients with websites, interactive campaigns and promotions, and other business solutions using internet technologies.  The ICM operates as a complete suite of interactive resources and knowledge for the agency, focused on mutually growing revenues.  During this process, the ICM traditionally operates behind the scenes and does not have direct contact with the agency's client.

Contract manufacturing as a business model has proven tremendously successful, as demonstrated in other industries such as automotive, electronics, textiles, and many others. Electronic contract manufacturing was spawned by IBM in 1981, and grew into a trend that revolutionized the industry. Interactive contract manufacturing applies these same principles. 

Advertising agencies have struggled to transition to next generation business, failing to successfully capitalize off of increasing interactive work demands.  As work for agencies has moved from offline to online, their choices for delivering interactive projects have been inefficient.  Historically, agencies were relegated to hiring an in-house team of developers or outsourcing to a local webshop.  These two options have been poor for agencies, because they have not positioned the agency to experience sustainable success.

The ICM serves to maximize business opportunities, economies of scale, and profitability for their partners.

See also 

Contract manufacturing
Electronic contract manufacturing

References 

Business models